Putnam City may refer to:

Bethany, Oklahoma, a town located within the Putnam City School District
Putnam City School District, a school district located in Northwest Oklahoma City
Putnam City High School, a high school located within the Putnam City School district
Putnam City North High School, a high school located within the Putnam City School district
Putnam City West High School, a high school located within the Putnam City School district
Warr Acres, Oklahoma, a town located within the Putnam City School district

See also
Oklahoma City
Northwest Oklahoma City